Phelps Lake is located in Grand Teton National Park, in the U. S. state of Wyoming. The natural lake is located at the entrance to Death Canyon in the southern section of the park. A number of hiking trails can be found near the lake, the most popular being a 1.8 mile (2.9 km) roundtrip hike to the Phelps Lake overlook.

Jumping Rock

"Jumping Rock" is a popular rock that sits on the northern side of Phelps Lake. It is so called "Jumping Rock" for the reason that it performs as a natural diving board. It is a 25–30 foot drop into the lake, but the water is deep enough for those brave enough to jump in. The water is cold, even in August.

See also
Geology of the Grand Teton area

Cited references

External links
Hi-resolution panorama of Phelps Lake

Lakes of Grand Teton National Park
Lakes of Teton County, Wyoming
Tourist attractions in Teton County, Wyoming
Lakes of Wyoming